Fabian Hertner (born 24 February 1985) is a Swiss orienteering competitor. He became Junior World Champion in the middle distance in 2005. Hertner runs for Kalevan Rasti in club competitions.

He won a silver medal in sprint at the 2009 World Orienteering Championships in Miskolc, Hungary and a bronze in middle at the 2012 in Col de la Givrine.

References

External links
 
 

1985 births
Living people
Swiss orienteers
Male orienteers
Foot orienteers
World Orienteering Championships medalists
Competitors at the 2017 World Games
Junior World Orienteering Championships medalists